Zoltán Téglás  is an American singer. He was the frontman of melodic hardcore band Ignite from 1994 to 2020 and was also the lead vocalist of Pennywise for a short time, appearing on their tenth album All or Nothing. He has collaborated with other bands including The Misfits, Motörhead and Blind Myself. Téglás has another side project called Zoli Band.

Career 
Téglás toured with The Misfits in October–November 2000, filling in on vocals for the Misfits during a number of North American tour dates after Michale Graves left the band. In the Motörhead-song "God Was Never on Your Side" (on the Kiss of Death album) he added backing vocals. Since 1993 he is the lead singer of the California-based band Ignite, and he plays in another band, the Zoli Band. He replaced Jim Lindberg (who pursued a side project as lead singer for his newly formed band The Black Pacific) for a few concerts in Pennywise, after the former left the band in 2009. On February 16, 2010, Pennywise officially announced Téglás as Lindberg's replacement. Pennywise released their tenth studio album All or Nothing on May 1, 2012, their first album with Téglás on vocals. In a May 2012 interview with AMP, Téglás was asked if he was going to make another record with Pennywise. His response was, "I don't know if there is going to be a next time because we might kill each other in the process."
In October 2012, Jim Lindberg rejoined Pennywise, ending Zoli's short term as lead singer (in which time Zoli also suffered back injuries, limiting how much touring he was able to do with Pennywise).

In 2006 he helped the Hungarian metalcore band Blind Myself to tour in the US; they sang a song together ("Lost in Time").

On November 25, 2019, Téglás announced that he was leaving Ignite after 25 years.

Personal life 
Zoli's father (now  deceased) emigrated to the United States after World War II, his mother in the 1960s; both came from Hungary. Téglás is proud of his Hungarian heritage and has several tattoos with Hungarian motifs and symbols, including Matthias Corvinus, the Coat of arms of Hungary, and a tribute to the 1956 Hungarian Revolution. On a hidden track at the end of "A Place Called Home" and "Our Darkest Days", Téglás sings a traditional folk song in Hungarian. The song "A Place Called Home" is a reworking of a well-known traditional Hungarian folk song, A csitári hegyek alatt, which can be translated as "Under the Mountains of Csitár" (a reference to a region in northern Hungary and southern Slovakia). Téglás speaks English and Hungarian fluently, having spent much time in the country of his parents.

Zoli rescues and takes pelicans and other sea birds to rehabilitation hospital.

For a time in the late 90s, he worked as a stunt performer; during one filming for a Jackie Chan movie, he suffered a serious spinal injury. He has appeared in Spectral in a cameo role.

Sea Shepherd 
He is a supporter of the Sea Shepherd Conservation Society. At the May 2010 Pennywise gig at O2 Academy Birmingham, as well as the December 18 Ignite show at Chain Reaction in Anaheim, California, he wore a Sea Shepherd T-shirt, promoted the organization between songs and had an official Sea Shepherd merchandise stall setup alongside the Pennywise stall. He is also the 'Volunteer Music & Outreach Coordinator' for Sea Shepherd.
He featured on an episode of Hope for Wildlife.

References 
https://staging.blabbermouth.net/news/singer-zoltan-zoli-teglas-quits-ignite/

External links 
 igniteband.com
 Zoltán on artistdirect
 Interview with Zoltán 
 Interview with Zoltán in Hungarian Television TV2 

Living people
American punk rock musicians
American people of Hungarian descent
Musicians from Los Angeles
American male musicians
People from Veresegyház
Year of birth missing (living people)